Isaac Mason Hill (c.1816 – 31 August 1885) was a social reformer, servant, storekeeper and ironmonger from New Zealand. He was born in Birmingham, England on c.1816. He died in Nelson, New Zealand on 31 August 1885.

References

1816 births
1885 deaths
People from Birmingham, West Midlands
New Zealand Quakers
New Zealand philanthropists
Servants
New Zealand activists
New Zealand traders
English emigrants to New Zealand
19th-century philanthropists
New Zealand domestic workers